"One Night in Bangkok" is a song from the concept album and subsequent musical Chess by Tim Rice, Benny Andersson, and Björn Ulvaeus. British actor and singer Murray Head raps the verses, while the chorus is sung by Anders Glenmark, a Swedish singer, songwriter, and producer.

The release topped the charts in many countries, including South Africa, West Germany, Switzerland, Denmark, and Australia. It peaked at No. 3 in both Canada and the United States in May 1985 and at No. 12 in the United Kingdom.

Lyrics and music
The full version of the song begins with an orchestral introduction, entitled "Bangkok", of Oriental style. This serves as the introduction to Act 2 in the original musical album, feeding into the first verse of "One Night in Bangkok" itself with an abrupt change in musical style.

The main song has a pop styling, whose lyrics describe the Thai capital city and its nightlife in the context of a chess match. In the original concept album for the musical, Swedish artist Anders Glenmark sang in the chorus, whereas the verses are a rap originally performed by Murray Head as the American chess grandmaster, a character known as Frederick "Freddie" Trumper in the staged versions. In the staged versions, a musical ensemble performs the choruses. Whereas the choruses extol Bangkok's reputation and exciting atmosphere, the American's verses ridicule the city, describing its attractions—the red-light district (Soi Cowboy), Chao Phraya River ("muddy old river"), Wat Pho ("reclining Buddha")—as less interesting to him than a game of chess. These sarcastic denunciations led to Thailand's Mass Communications Organisation issuing a ban on the song in 1985, saying its lyrics "cause misunderstanding about Thai society and show disrespect towards Buddhism".

The lyrics mention actor Yul Brynner, about six months before his death, who had played the King of Siam in the Broadway musical and the 1956 film The King and I (also banned in Thailand). Other Thai-related references in the lyrics include ones to Thailand's former name ("Siam"), kathoeys ("You'll find a god in every golden cloister — And if you're lucky then the god's a she"), and the Oriental Hotel (girls "are set up in the Somerset Maugham suite", to which the verse replies "I get my kicks above the waistline, sunshine").

The "Tyrolean spa" mentioned early in the song refers to Merano in the South Tyrol region of Italy, the site of Act 1 of the musical and location of the World Chess Championship in 1981. It also mentions three places where chess tournaments were previously held: Iceland (1972); the Philippines (1975 and 1978); and Hastings, UK (Hastings International Chess Congress).

In the original London production of Chess, the setting for the song is an interview by Freddie, who is in Bangkok to serve as a TV analyst for a match involving his rival, world champion and Russian defector Anatoly Sergievsky. In the original Broadway production of the musical, the song appears not at the start of Act 2, but rather in the middle of Act 1, whereas in this version, the world championship of Freddie vs. Anatoly takes place in Bangkok.

Track listings
7" single
"One Night in Bangkok" – 3:54
"Merano" by The London Symphony Orchestra & The Ambrosian Singers – 7:08

12" maxi
"One Night in Bangkok" – 5:38
"Merano" by The London Symphony Orchestra & The Ambrosian Singers – 7:08

Charts and sales

Weekly charts

Year-end charts

Certifications

Robey version
While Head's "Bangkok" was just starting to climb the Billboard Hot 100, Canadian singer and actress Robey hit the charts with her own version. It spent three weeks on the Hot 100 in March 1985, peaking at No. 77. Robey's version fared even better on the Billboard Hot Dance Club Play chart, peaking at No. 5.

Charts

C21 version

Danish boy band C21 released their version in 2003 as the fourth and final single from their eponymous debut album. It reached No. 11 in Denmark.

Vinylshakerz version

In 2005, German group Vinylshakerz remixed the song. It was released in 2005 as the lead single from their debut album, Very Superior. It was a hit across Europe, charting in Austria, Belgium, Finland, Germany, the Netherlands and Switzerland.

Charts

See also
List of number-one singles in Australia during the 1980s
List of European number-one hits of 1985
List of number-one hits of 1985 (Germany)
List of number-one singles of the 1980s (Switzerland)

References

1984 songs
1984 singles
1985 singles
2003 singles
2005 singles
European Hot 100 Singles number-one singles
Kontor Records singles
List songs
Murray Head songs
Number-one singles in Australia
Number-one singles in Finland
Number-one singles in Germany
Number-one singles in South Africa
Number-one singles in Spain
Number-one singles in Switzerland
RCA Records singles
Songs about cities
Songs from Chess (musical)
Songs with lyrics by Tim Rice
Songs written by Benny Andersson and Björn Ulvaeus
Ultratop 50 Singles (Flanders) number-one singles
C21 (band) songs